Addaea is a genus of moths of the family Thyrididae erected by Francis Walker in 1866.

Description
Palpi upturned, short and thickly scaled. Antennae annulated and minutely ciliated. Hind tibia thickened. Forewings with vein 8 and 9 stalked. Vein 10 from just before the angle of cell. Hindwing with vein 5 from the center of discocellulars.

Species
Addaea aneranna Turner, 1915
Addaea fragilis Warren, 1899
Addaea fulva Warren, 1907
Addaea heliopsamma (Meyrick, 1886)
Addaea polyphoralis (Walker, 1866)
Addaea pusilla (Butler, 1887)
Addaea subtessellata Walker, 1866
Addaea trimeronalis (Walker, 1859)

References

External links

Thyrididae
Ditrysia genera